Vicente Flor Bustos (born 5 November 1987 in Valencia) is a Spanish footballer who plays as a goalkeeper.

External links

1987 births
Living people
Footballers from Valencia (city)
Spanish footballers
Association football goalkeepers
Segunda División players
Segunda División B players
Tercera División players
Villarreal CF C players
Villarreal CF B players
Huracán Valencia CF players
UD Alzira footballers
Ontinyent CF players
Spain youth international footballers